Lewis Edwin Jenks (August 23, 1840 - August 8, 1888) was a noted American silversmith, active in Boston.

Jenks was born in Pawtucket, Rhode Island, to George Almond Jenks, and Phebe (Clapp) Jenks. He married Phoebe Ann Pickering Hoyt on November 10, 1863, in Boston, worked at the Boston firm of Bigelow Bros. & Kennard, went into business on his own around 1872, and was a partner from 1876 to 1880 with Edward Parry Kennard in Boston as Kennard & Jenks at 576 Washington Street. The partners manufactured fine quality sterling flatware, probably retailed by Bigelow, Kennard & Co.; in 1880 their firm was purchased by the Gorham Manufacturing Company and relocated to Providence, Rhode Island. His son, Barton Pickering Jenks (1870–1941), later carried on the family business as Goodnow & Jenks, creators of colonial revival silver and the leading Boston silversmiths of the 1890s. In this role, he took on George Christian Gebelein as an apprentice. The elder Jenks died in Boston and was buried at Mount Hope Cemetery in Mattapan, Massachusetts.

References 
 "Lewis Edwin Jenks", American Silversmiths.
 "Lewis E. Jenks Antique Sterling Silver Pitcher, Boston, c. 1875", Spencer Marks, Ltd.
 Silver in America, 1840–1940: a century of splendor, Charles Lane Venable, Dallas Museum of Art, 1995, page 320.
 Encyclopedia of American silver manufacturers, Dorothy T. Rainwater, Schiffer Pub., 1986, page 98.
 George Christian Gebelein, Boston Silversmith, 1878–1945: A Biographical Sketch, Margaretha Gebelein Leighton, Esther Gebelein Swain, J. Herbert Gebelein, Gebelein, 1976, page 13.
 "Lewis E. Jenks", Online Encyclopedia of Silver Marks, Hallmarks & Makers' Marks.
 "Lewis E. Jenks", Silver Collection Marks.
 "Lewis Edwin Jenks", Find-A-Grave memorial.

American silversmiths
1840 births
1888 deaths
People from Pawtucket, Rhode Island